Md Ismail Hossain was a police officer who served as the 14th Inspector General of Police of Bangladesh Police during 1997–1998.He was born at Fulbaria,a village of Sarishabari Upazila in Jamalpur District.

Early life and education 
Hossain grew up in the Jamalpur district in Bangladesh where he attended Bhatura High School.

Career
Hossain joined Pakistan Police Service in 1966 as Assistant Superintendent of Police.

Hossain served as the Inspector General of Bangladesh Police from 16 November 1997 to 27 September 1998. He was the first IGP from the Greater Mymensingh Area.

Death
Hossain died on 27 October 2016 in Apollo Hospital Dhaka.

References

2016 deaths
Bangladeshi diplomats
Inspectors General of Police (Bangladesh)
Place of birth missing
Date of birth missing
Year of birth missing